Phalaenopsis honghenensis, also known as 红河蝴蝶兰 (hong he hu die lan) in Chinese, is a species of orchid native to Southeast China and Vietnam. The specific epithet honghenensis refers to Honghe, China.

Description
Like other members of Phalaenopsis section Aphyllae, this plant exhibits deciduous leaflessness. However, it usually has 1-2 leaves, which are produced on up to 1 cm long stems, which are imbricated in leaf bases. The 5-7 cm long and 1.5-2.5 cm wide leaves are obliquely elliptic and show purple spotting. Verrucose, photosynthetic adventitious roots radiate from the stem. Pink to pale green, 2.9 cm wide flowers are produced on 3-6 flowered, up to 7.7 cm long racemes. A small spur is produced by the labellum.

Gallery

Taxonomy
The variable colouration may be a source of confusion. The flowers may be rose pink or infused with green.
The true phylogenetic relationships within the section Aphyllae are subject of dispute, which is fueled by confusion caused through various authors describing and synonymizing species within this group. Thus, species delimitation and identification is a complex matter.

Ecology
This species grows in elevations of 2000 m above sea level.

Conservation
International trade is regulated through the CITES appendix II regulations of international trade.

References

honghenensis
Orchids of China
Orchids of Vietnam
Flora of Vietnam
Flora of China